German submarine U-391 was a Type VIIC U-boat of Nazi Germany's Kriegsmarine during World War II.

She carried out one patrol. She did not sink or damage any ships.

She was sunk by a British aircraft northwest of Cape Ortegal in Spain on 13 December 1943.

Design
German Type VIIC submarines were preceded by the shorter Type VIIB submarines. U-391 had a displacement of  when at the surface and  while submerged. She had two shafts and two  propellers.

U-391 was fitted with five  torpedo tubes (four fitted at the bow and one at the stern), fourteen torpedoes, one  SK C/35 naval gun, 220 rounds, and two twin  C/30 anti-aircraft guns. The boat had a complement of between forty-four and sixty.

Service history
The submarine was laid down on 9 January 1942 at the Howaldtswerke (yard) at Flensburg as yard number 23, launched on 5 March and commissioned on 24 April 1943 under the command of Oberleutnant zur See Gert Dültgen.

The boat was a member of three wolfpacks.

She served with the 5th U-boat Flotilla from 24 April 1943 and the 3rd flotilla from 1 October of the same year.

Patrol and loss
The boat departed Kiel on 23 October 1943. Passing through the gap that separates Iceland and the Faroe Islands, she was attacked by a Vickers Wellington of No. 179 Squadron RAF on 28 November.

On 13 December, she was attacked and sunk by depth charges dropped from a British B-24 Liberator of 53 Squadron on the western edge of the Bay of Biscay, northwest of Cape Ortegal in Spain.

51 men died in the U-boat; there were no survivors.

Wolfpacks
U-391 took part in three wolfpacks, namely:
 Eisenhart 1 (9 – 15 November 1943) 
 Schill 3 (18 – 22 November 1943) 
 Weddigen (22 November – 7 December 1943)

References

Bibliography

External links

German Type VIIC submarines
U-boats commissioned in 1943
U-boats sunk in 1943
U-boats sunk by depth charges
1943 ships
Ships built in Kiel
Ships lost with all hands
U-boats sunk by British aircraft
World War II submarines of Germany
World War II shipwrecks in the Atlantic Ocean
Maritime incidents in December 1943